Marlou du Plessis van Niekerk is a South African rugby union player who last played for the  in the Rugby Challenge. His regular position is fly-half.

Career

He was included in the senior squad for the 2013 Vodacom Cup. He made his debut against .

References

South African rugby union players
Eastern Province Elephants players
Living people
1993 births
Rugby union fly-halves
Rugby union players from the Northern Cape